The Lakhra Coal Mine is a coal mine located in Sindh. The mine has coal reserves amounting to 1.33 billion tonnes of coking coal, one of the largest coal reserves in Pakistan.

See also 
 Coal mining in Pakistan
 List of mines in Pakistan

References 

Mines in Pakistan
Coal mines in Pakistan